The  members (species) of this genus are found  in the Neotropical realm.

Johnsonita is a genus of butterflies in the family Lycaenidae.

Species
Johnsonita assula (Draudt, 1919)
 Johnsonita auda (Hewitson, 1867)
 Johnsonita catadupa (Hewitson, 1869)
 Johnsonita chlamydem (Druce, 1907)
 Johnsonita johnbanksi Bálint, 2003
 Johnsonita johnsoni Salazar & Constantino, 1995
 Johnsonita pardoa (D'Abrera, 1995)
 Johnsonita spp. – 11 undescribed

References

Eumaeini
Lycaenidae of South America
Lycaenidae genera